Heterodimeric amino-acid transporters are a family of transport proteins that facilitate the transport of certain amino acids across cell membranes.  Each comprises a light and a heavy protein subunit.  Transport activity happens in the light.

The following table lists the members of this family:

References 

Transport proteins
Protein families
Solute carrier family